Thames Wharf is a planned Docklands Light Railway station in the Royal Docks, East London. The station name was previously proposed for another station in the area.

Beckton branch station
Given construction of flying junctions for access to the Stratford International and Woolwich Arsenal branches of the DLR, construction of this station is no longer possible.

Woolwich Arsenal branch station
Development is restricted by safeguarding for a future river crossing, and the area is surrounded by brownfield and industrial sites.

In the 2010s, a new Thames river crossing was announced - the Silvertown Tunnel. Following the completion of the tunnel in 2025, around 5,000 homes will be built on the site, and a new DLR station would be constructed. As part of the 2018 budget, the Chancellor announced funding for the DLR to support this and other development in the Royal Docks. Funding for the station was put on hold in June 2021.

Services

References

Thames Wharf
Proposed railway stations in London
Silvertown